The Amorous Man (Comanche, Pahayoko, "aunt copulate") (c. late 1780s – p. 1852) was a civil chief of the Penateka band of the Comanche Indians.

Early life
Nothing is known of his youth or early years. Older than these war chiefs, Amorous Man was a member of the same Comanche band, the Penateka or "Honey Eaters", as Buffalo Hump (Potsʉnakwahipʉ), Yellow Wolf (Isaviah), and Santa Anna. Although known as a civil, or peace, chief, he was known to lead war parties during the 1820s. He was an important chief during the 1830s and 1840s who had diplomatic relations with Anglo settlements in Texas, following the Council House Massacre.

Name 
His name is variously spelled Potsʉnakwahipʉ, Pahhauca, Pahayoko, Payayuca, Pahajoko, and Taqquanno, which is translated as "The Amorous Man" or more colorful descriptions.

Councils and treaties

The Amorous Man represented the Penateka division at the Camp Holmes Council in 1835, signing the treaty with Gen. M. Arbuckle and Sen. Monfort Stokes, along with chiefs such Tawaquenah (Sun Eagle) of the Kotsoteka and Iron Jacket (Puhihwikwasu'u) of the Quahadi Comanche (named as Pohowetowshah, Brass Man).

In 1838, The Amorous Man went to Houston, where he, Spirit Talker (Mukwooru), Old Owl (Mupitsukupʉ), and Potsʉnakwahipʉ met Texas President Sam Houston and signed a treaty. Like most Comanche chiefs, The Amorous Man came to white attention following the Council House Massacre in 1840. But, if Old Owl was the first among the Comanche Chiefs to recognize that defeating the whites was unlikely, Pahayoko was, probably, the second among the Penatekas: in 1843 he accepted to meet the Indian agent Daniel Watson and, in 1844, he attended the Tehuacana Creek Council, along with Old Owl, Potsʉnakwahipʉ (Buffalo Hump) and other chiefs, not including Isaviah (Yellow Wolf) and Santa Anna, but refused to sign the treaty. Nor was he part in the Meusebach-Comanche Treaty, signed by Mupitsukupʉ, Potsʉnakwahipʉ and Santa Anna. 

The Amorous Man, Mupitsukupʉ (Old Owl), Potsʉnakwahipʉ, Isaviah, Santa Anna, Ketumse, Tosahwi, and Asa-havey (Wolf's Road or Starry Road) signed the Tehuacana Treaty in April 1846, allowing the federal jurisdiction without getting any recognition of the borders of Comanche territory. The Amorous Man signed the Butler-Lewis Treaty of 1846.

Final years 
After the cholera and smallpox epidemics of 1848 and 1849 reduced the Comanche population from approximately 20,000 to fewer than 12,000 within two years, The Amorous Man went to settle as permanent guest among the Kotsoteka, later, in 1852, going to settle near the springs of the Big Wichita River with Potsʉnakwahipʉ, Ketumse and Shanaco. His death's date is unknown.

References

Bibliography
 Bial, Raymond. Lifeways: The Comanche. New York: Benchmark Books, 2000.
 Brice, Donaly E. The Great Comanche Raid: Boldest Indian Attack on the Texas Republic McGowan Book Co. 1987
 Fehrenbach, Theodore Reed The Comanches: The Destruction of a People. New York: Knopf, 1974, . Later (2003) republished under the title The Comanches: The History of a People
 John, Elizabeth and A.H. Storms Brewed in Other Men's Worlds: The Confrontation of the Indian, Spanish, and French in the Southwest, 1540–1795. College Station, TX: Texas A&M Press, 1975.
 Lodge, Sally. Native American People: The Comanche. Vero Beach, Florida 32964: Rourke Publications, Inc., 1992.
 Lund, Bill. Native Peoples: The Comanche Indians. Mankato, Minnesota: Bridgestone Books, 1997.
 Mooney, Martin. The Junior Library of American Indians: The Comanche Indians. New York: Chelsea House Publishers, 1993.
 Native Americans: Comanche (August 13, 2005).
 Richardson, Rupert N. The Comanche Barrier to South Plains Settlement: A Century and a Half of Savage Resistance to the Advancing White Frontier. Glendale, CA: Arthur H. Clark Company, 1933.
 Rollings, Willard. Indians of North America: The Comanche. New York: Chelsea House Publishers, 1989.
 Secoy, Frank. Changing Military Patterns on the Great Plains. Monograph of the American Ethnological Society, No. 21. Locust Valley, NY: J. J. Augustin, 1953.
 Schilz, Jodye Lynn Dickson and Thomas F.Schilz. Buffalo Hump and the Penateka Comanches, El Paso: Texas Western Press, 1989.
 Streissguth, Thomas. Indigenous Peoples of North America: The Comanche. San Diego: Lucent Books Incorporation, 2000.
 Wallace, Ernest, and E. Adamson Hoebel. The Comanches: Lords of the Southern Plains. Norman: University of Oklahoma Press, 1952.

1780s births
19th-century deaths
Native American leaders
Native American people of the Indian Wars
Comanche people
People from Texas
Texas–Indian Wars
1840 in the United States
Native American history of Texas